Pescara is a city in Italy.

Pescara may also refer to:
 Aterno-Pescara, a river in Italy
 Pescara Airport, an airport in Pescara
 Pescara Calcio, an Italian football (soccer) club
 Pescara Circuit, a race course near Pescara
 Pescara Grand Prix, a race held in Italy
 Province of Pescara, a province in Italy
 Raúl Pateras Pescara an Argentine helicopter pioneer